The State Within is a six-part British television political thriller series, written and created by Lizzie Mickery and Daniel Percival, that was broadcast on BBC One in the United Kingdom from Thursday, 2 November 2006. The series, directed by Percival and Michael Offer and produced by Grainne Marmion, is a joint production between BBC Films and BBC America that follows Sir Mark Brydon (Jason Isaacs), the British Ambassador to Washington, who is caught in the centre of a political conspiracy threatening to depose Western governments. As such, he must prevent a war, all whilst facing his own personal dilemmas.

On 22 January 2007, the series was released on DVD in the United Kingdom. In the United States, the series premiered during Presidents Day weekend as a three-part miniseries, concluding on 24 February 2007. After being repeated on BBC Four in June 2007 as part of the channel's Conspiracy U.S.A. week of programming, the series subsequently released on Netflix worldwide, where it was edited down into seven 50-minute episodes. The series was subsequently nominated for two Golden Globe Awards in the categories Best Mini-Series or Motion Picture Made for Television and Best Actor - Miniseries or Television Film.

Plot
Lynne Warner (Sharon Gless) is the United States Secretary of Defense, Nicholas Brocklehurst (Ben Daniels) is nominally the British Counsellor External Affairs, but is a Secret Intelligence Service (MI6) agent assigned to embassy duty, and James Sinclair (Alex Jennings) is the former British ambassador to the fictional former Soviet republic of Tyrgyzstan (cf. Kyrgyzstan). This character resembles Craig Murray, the British ambassador who exposed British and American complicity in torture and human rights abuses in Uzbekistan.

Cast

Main cast
 Jason Isaacs as Sir Mark Brydon; British ambassador to Washington
 Ben Daniels as Nicholas Brocklehurst; an MI6 agent and Counsellor for External Affairs
 Eva Birthistle as Jane Lavery; employee of the Human Rights Commission
 Neil Pearson as Phil Lonsdale; Deputy Head of Mission at the British Embassy
 Genevieve O'Reilly as Caroline Hanley; daughter of the plane victim
 Sharon Gless as Lynne Warner; American Secretary of Defence
 Noam Jenkins as Christopher Styles; Head of Defence Intelligence
 Ted Whittall as Gordon Adair; CEO of the Armitage Corporation
 Christopher Bolton as Vinny Swain
 Nigel Bennett as Colonel Charles Macintyre; president of CMC Secure Operations
 Marnie McPhail as George Blake
 Alex Jennings as James Sinclair; ex-British Ambassador to Tyrgyzan
 Aaron Abrams as Matthew Weiss
 Lennie James as Luke Gardner; an ex-British paratrooper currently on Death Row for murder

Supporting cast
 Emma Campbell as Sally Davis
 Rahnuma Panthaky as Nasreen Qureshi
 Briony Glassco as Jennifer Grimes
 Louca Tassone as Azzam Sinclair
 Roman Podhora as Vernon Burchill
 Michael Rhoades as Gary Pritchard
 Ron Lea as Carl Garcia
 Patrick Garrow as Brad Godovsky
 David Eisner as Sam Levinson

Episodes

References

External links
 

BBC Film films
2000s British drama television series
2006 British television series debuts
2006 British television series endings
BBC high definition shows
BBC television dramas
British political drama television series
2000s British television miniseries
2006 in British politics
English-language television shows
Television shows set in London
Television shows set in Canada
Television shows set in the United States